is a Japanese football player. He plays for Okinawa SV.

Playing career
Masatoshi Aki joined to SC Sagamihara in 2013. In July 2016, he moved to Vonds Ichihara.

Club statistics
Updated to 20 February 2016.

References

External links

1990 births
Living people
Tokyo Gakugei University alumni
Association football people from Tokyo Metropolis
People from Koganei, Tokyo
Japanese footballers
J3 League players
Japan Football League players
SC Sagamihara players
Vonds Ichihara players
Okinawa SV players
Association football defenders